Washington's 7th congressional district encompasses most of Seattle and Burien, and all of Vashon Island, Lake Forest Park, Edmonds, Shoreline, and Normandy Park. Since 2017, the 7th district has been represented in the U.S. House of Representatives by Democrat Pramila Jayapal.

The 7th is the most Democratic district in the Pacific Northwest, and the most Democratic district on the West Coast outside the San Francisco Bay Area or Los Angeles. It is also the most Democratic majority-white district in the United States. Democrats dominate every level of government, and routinely win elections with well over 70% of the vote. Al Gore won the 7th in 2000 with 72% of the vote, while John Kerry won 79% in 2004. Barack Obama took 84% of the vote in 2008.

Washington's seventh seat in the U.S. House was added after the 1950 census, but the state did not immediately reapportion. It was contested as a statewide at-large seat in three elections, 1952, 1954, and 1956, and voters cast ballots for two congressional seats, their district and the at-large. Democrat Donald H. Magnuson won all three at-large elections. The 1958 election was the first after the state reapportioned to seven districts; Magnuson was elected to the new district in 1958 and 1960, but lost in 1962.

Election results from presidential races

List of members representing the district

Recent election results

2012

2014

2016

2018

2020

2022

See also
United States House of Representatives elections in Washington, 2008
United States House of Representatives elections in Washington, 2010
United States House of Representatives elections in Washington, 2012

References

 Congressional Biographical Directory of the United States 1774–present

External links
Washington State Redistricting Commission
Find your new congressional district: a searchable map, Seattle Times, January 13, 2012

07